Tsuka is a former Maidu settlement in Butte County, California. It was located in the neighborhood of Forbestown; its precise location is unknown.

References

Former settlements in Butte County, California
Former Native American populated places in California
Lost Native American populated places in the United States
Maidu villages